Emperor Gaozu of Han (256 – 1 June 195 BC), born Liu Bang with courtesy name Ji (季), was the founder and first emperor of the Han dynasty, reigning in 202–195 BC. His temple name was "Taizu" while his posthumous name was Emperor Gao, or Gaodi; "Gaozu of Han", derived from the Records of the Grand Historian, is the common way of referring to this sovereign even though he was not accorded the temple name "Gaozu", which literally means "High Founder".

Liu Bang was one of the few dynasty founders in Chinese history who was born into a peasant family.  Prior to coming to power, Liu Bang initially served for the Qin dynasty as a minor law enforcement officer in his home town Pei County, within the conquered state of Chu. With the First Emperor's death and the Qin Empire's subsequent political chaos, Liu Bang renounced his civil service position and became an anti-Qin rebel leader.  He won the race against fellow rebel leader Xiang Yu to invade the Qin heartland and forced the surrender of the Qin ruler Ziying in 206 BC.

After the fall of the Qin, Xiang Yu, as the de facto chief of the rebel forces, divided the former Qin Empire into the Eighteen Kingdoms, and Liu Bang was forced to accept the poor and remote Bashu region (present-day Sichuan, Chongqing, and southern Shaanxi) with the title "King of Han".  Within the year, Liu Bang broke out with his army and conquered the Three Qins, starting a civil war known as the Chu–Han Contention as various forces battled for supremacy over China.

In 202 BC, Liu Bang emerged victorious following the Battle of Gaixia, unified most of China under his control, and established the Han dynasty with himself as the founding emperor. During his reign, Liu Bang reduced taxes and corvée, promoted Confucianism, and suppressed revolts by the lords of non-Liu vassal states, among many other actions. He also initiated the policy of heqin to maintain a de jure peace between the Han Empire and the Xiongnu after losing the Battle of Baideng in 200 BCE.  He died in 195 BCE and was succeeded by his son, Liu Ying.

Birth and early life
In imperial Han myth, Liu Bang's ancestors were the mythical Emperor Yao and the Yellow Emperor. Many ancient Chinese noble families claimed descent from the Yellow Emperor to justify their right to rule.

Liu Bang was born during the late years of the Warring States period; his parents are only remembered as "Liu Taigong" (劉太公; lit. "Old Sir Liu") and "Liu Ao" (劉媪; lit. "Old Madam Liu") His family was from Zhongyang (Feng district, Pei County) in the state of Chu. According to legend, Liu Bang was conceived after Liu Ao encountered a dragon during a rainstorm.

According to records, the young Liu was outspoken, charismatic, generous, and forbearing, but he had little interest in education or work and frequently ran into trouble with the law; he was dependent on his brother for subsistence and his father called him "little rascal". Later, he became good friends with Zhang Er (?–202 BCE), the magistrate of the nearby Waihuang County and former retainer of Lord Xinling. Liu lived with Zhang Er for several months, until the latter went into hiding after the conquest of Chu by Qin.

Liu returned to Pei County. His close friends at the county office, Xiao He and Cao Shen, hid his delinquent behaviour and helped him to be appointed as the local sheriff at Sishui Pavilion. Liu Bang forged close relationships with most of the local county bureaucrats, and earned a small reputation in the district. While performing statute labour in Xianyang, the Qin capital, he witnessed Qin Shi Huang undertaking an inspection tour; the royal procession impressed Liu.

Liu's wife, Lü Zhi, was the daughter of Lü Wen, a wealthy and influential gentry from Shanfu County. After moving to Pei County, Lü Wen held a feast for the local elite. Xiao He, who helped to collect gifts from the guests, declared that a seat inside the hall required gifts worth at least a thousand coins. Liu attended the feast without money, and made an offer of ten thousand coins which Xiao He realized was not serious. Nonetheless, Lü had Liu seated beside him based on appearance alone. Lü, further impressed by Liu in conversation, offered his daughter in marriage. Liu and Lü Zhi were married and had two children, Liu Ying (the future Emperor Hui) and the future Princess Yuan of Lu.

Insurrection against the Qin dynasty

Liu was responsible for escorting a group of penal laborers to the construction site of the First Emperor's mausoleum at Mount Li. During the journey, some prisoners escaped; under Qin law, allowing prisoners to escape was punishable by death. Rather than face justice, Liu freed the remaining prisoners and fled. Liu was joined by some of the grateful ex-prisoners, and he became their leader. They took over an abandoned stronghold on Mount Mangdang. Liu secretly remained in contact with some old friends, including Xiao He and Cao Shen in Pei County.

According to the legend of the "Uprising of the Slaying of the White Serpent", Liu's ascension to rulership was prophesied after becoming an outlaw. In the legend, a gigantic white serpent killed some of the outlaws with its poisonous breath; the serpent was killed by a drunk Liu during the night. The next morning, the outlaws encountered an old woman along the road; when asked why she was crying she mysteriously disappeared after replying: "My child, the White Emperor's son, has been slain by the son of the Red Emperor." Liu's reputation grew among his followers, who became convinced of his destiny.

In 209 BCE, Chen Sheng and Wu Guang started the anti-Qin Dazexiang Uprising. The magistrate of Pei County considered joining the rebellion, and – on the advice of Xiao He and Cao Shen – invited Liu's group to the county to support him; the invitation was transmitted by Fan Kuai, Liu's brother-in-law. However, the magistrate changed his mind and rescinded the offer; he also ordered Xiao and Cao to be killed lest they open the gates for Liu, but they escaped and joined Liu. On Xiao's advice, Liu secured the aid of commoners from the county beside Pei through written appeals delivered by arrows fired across the border. Peasants responded by killing the Pei County magistrate and welcoming Liu's return. Liu became known as the self-styled "Duke of Pei".

In 208 BC, the Qin empire faced rebellions that sought to restore the states conquered during the wars of unification. In Wu County, the uprising of Xiang Liang – a commoner and son of a Chu general – installed Xiong Xin as "King Huai II" of Chu. Liu joined Xiang Liang's uprising. After Xiang Liang was killed at the Battle of Dingtao, Huai II sent Xiang Yu – Xiang Liang's nephew – and minister Song Yi to lead an army to reinforce the Zhao state against the attacking Qin.

Liu Bang was made "Marquis of Wu'an" and ordered to lead an army against Guanzhong in the Qin heartland. Huai II promised to grant rulership of Guanzhong as "King of Guanzhong" to whoever entered the region first. In 206 BC, Liu Bang won the race to Guanzhong over Xiang and arrived outside Xianyang, the Qin capital. The last Qin ruler, Ziying, surrendered the city without resistance. Liu's occupation policies were informed by Fan Kuai – now his bodyguard – and Zhang Liang – his strategist. Troops were forbidden from mistreating the population and looting. The harsh Qin laws were abolished; murder, robbery and burglary remained subject to strict punishments. Order was quickly restored in the city, and Liu won the respect of the Guanzhong population. Xiao He ordered the collection of all legal documents in the Qin palace and government facilities for preservation.

King of Han

Feast at Hong Gate

Xiang Yu disliked losing the race to Guanzhong. On the advice of Fan Zeng – his advisor – and Cao Wushang – an informer from Liu's camp – Xiang Yu planned to hold a banquet in which to assassinate Liu. Xiang Yu was persuaded by Xiang Bo, his uncle and a close friend of Zhang Liang, not to order the assassination during the banquet. Frustrated by the indecision, Fan Zeng ordered Xiang Zhuang, Xiang Yu's cousin, to perform and kill Liu during a sword dance, but this was stymied by Xiang Bo joining the dance and protecting Liu. Zhang Liang slipped away and summoned Fan Kuai, who arrived at the banquet in full armor and scolded Xiang Yu for the sinister plot. Embarrassed by Fan Kuai's accusation, Xiang Yu ordered the sword dance to stop and rewarded Fan Kuai for his bravery. Liu Bang escaped Xiang Yu's camp after pretending to go to the latrine, and then led his army westward. Xiang Yu then sacked Xianyang and burned the Epang Palace.

Enfeoffment at Hanzhong 
After occupying Xianyang, Xiang Yu proclaimed himself the "Hegemon-King of Western Chu" and split the former Qin Empire into the Eighteen Kingdoms. He gave Guanzhong to three former Qin generals – Zhang Han, Sima Xin and Dong Yi – instead of to Liu. Liu received the isolated Bashu region (Sichuan Basin and upper Han River valley), then a place used for exiling prisoners, as Xiang Yu claimed that Bashu was part of Guanzhong. Zhang Liang, who was leaving for his native state of Han, negotiated a better arrangement on Liu's behalf after bribing Xiang Yu through Xiang Bo. To Liu, Xiang Yu added Nanzheng, the surrounding rift valley region around the (then) middle Han River, and the title of "King of Han".

Liu's army was escorted across the Qinling Mountains by a detachment of Xiang Yu's army. On Zhang Liang's advice, Liu burned the gallery roads behind him to prevent attack by Xiang Yu, and to reassure Xiang Yu that he would not return.

Chu-Han contention 

From 206 to 202 BC, Liu Bang engaged Xiang Yu in a power struggle – historically known as the Chu–Han contention – for supremacy over China, while simultaneously attacking and subjugating the other kingdoms.

Conquest of the Three Qin

Liu Bang's migration into Nanzheng was far from pleasant – his followers were mostly from the Wu and Chu flatland regions and adapted poorly in the mountainous Bashu lands, and deserters grew on a daily basis. Liu Bang also grew temperamental, as he was very unhappy with his own predicament.  One night, rumor arrived that Xiao He also disappeared, and Liu Bang almost had a nervous breakdown.  When Xiao He returned the following morning, Liu Bang furiously confronted him and demanded an explanation. Xiao He revealed that he was in a rush chasing back an extremely talented military strategist named Han Xin, who was then merely a low-ranking officer only recently recruited into Liu Bang's army. Xiao He then introduced Liu Bang to Han Xin, who laid out his strategic plan to conquer the states. Impressed and convinced, Liu Bang formally assigned Han Xin as the supreme commander of his army.

Meanwhile, Xiang Yu's overbearing and arbitrary handling over the enfeoffments created much anger among the rebel leaders.  Merely four months after Liu Bang's departure into Bashu, a rebellion broke out in the Qi kingdom in late 206 BCE, and Xiang Yu left Western Chu to suppress the revolt.  Under Han Xin's advise, Liu Bang sent men to pretend trying to repair the previously burnt gallery roads, drawing away the attention of the Three Qins.  At the same time, Han Xin used the distraction to invade Guanzhong unexpectedly via Chencang, and quickly defeated Zhang Han in a surprise attack.  Following that, Sima Xin and Dong Yi both surrendered to Liu Bang, and by August or September 205 BC the Three Qins became part of Liu's Kingdom of Han.

Defeat at Pengcheng

With Xiang Yu occupied to the east, Liu Bang collected a force of 560,000 troops from his subordinate lands, and marched east to attack Western Chu.  En route, he encountered Peng Yue, who joined his cause upon promise of a fiefdom in Wei.  As opposed to combining forces, Liu Bang sent Peng Yue's 30,000 troops to pacify the surrounding area.  Liu Bang's army entered Xiang Yu's capital of Pengcheng apparently unopposed, looting its valuables and taking its women, but discipline had become lax and each day found the Han troops deeper in their cups.

Hearing of the fall of Pengcheng, Xiang Yu ordered the bulk of his forces to maintain the attack on Qi, while he personally led 30,000 crack troops to retake the capital.  He encamped about ten miles from a city in present-day Xiao County, Anhui, and launched an attack on Pengcheng at dawn, and by noon had routed the unprepared Han army, driving them into the nearby Gu and Si Rivers, where over 100,000 men drowned or were killed by Chu soldiers.  The remaining Han troops fled south to high ground, but were cornered by Chu forces by the Sui River, where another 100,000 drowned, their corpses damming up the river.

Liu Bang escaped the city with a handful of mounted bodyguards, heading to nearby Pei to collect his family.  Xiang Yu also dispatched troops to Pei in an attempt to capture Liu Bang's family.  His family had all fled, but Liu Bang encountered on the road his eldest daughter and second eldest son Liu Ying.  The Chu army coerced a local into leading them to capture two of Liu Bang's family as hostages: his father Liu Taigong and wife Lü Zhi. One account states Liu Bang's mother was also captured. The Records of the Grand Historian recounts an event during this conflict, an event omitted from Liu Bang's own biography but present in the biography of Xiang Yu, where Liu Bang pushed his own children out of his carriage three times to lighten it in a desperate attempt to escape Xiang Yu's men, and it is only the repeated intervention of Xiahou Ying that secures the children's escape.

Battle of Jingsuo
After the disastrous defeat at Pengcheng, the strength of the Han forces decreased drastically.  Many of the kings who had surrendered to Liu Bang earlier had also defected to Xiang Yu's side.  Moreover, the Qi and Zhao kingdoms, which were previously at war with Chu, also requested to make peace with Chu.

Upon reaching Xiayi (下邑; east of present-day Dangshan County, Suzhou, Anhui), which was defended by his brother-in-law, Liu Bang reorganised his troops for a retreat.  When he arrived at Yu (虞; present-day Yucheng County, Shangqiu, Henan), he sent an envoy to meet Ying Bu (King of Jiujiang) to appeal for support.  Ying Bu, who held a grudge over Xiang Yu's unfair enfeoffment over the Eighteen Kingdoms, agreed to join Liu Bang and rebelled against Western Chu.  Xiang Yu responded by sending Long Ju to attack Ying Bu.

In 205 BC, Liu Bang named his son Liu Ying as his crown prince and ordered him to defend Yueyang. Shortly after, Han forces conquered Feiqiu (廢丘; present-day Xingping, Shaanxi), which was guarded by Zhang Han, who committed suicide after his defeat.  On another front, Ying Bu was unable to defeat Long Ju so he gave up on Jiujiang and went to join Liu Bang.  Liu Bang reorganised his army, which now included reinforcements from Guanzhong (sent by Xiao He) and Han Xin's troops, and attacked Chu at Jing County (京縣; around present-day Xingyang, Zhengzhou, Henan) and Suoting (索亭; near present-day Xingyang, Henan). He emerged victorious, and drove Xiang Yu's forces east of Xingyang.

Battle of Chenggao and Treaty of Hong Canal
In 204 BC, after sustaining losses from Chu attacks on the newly built supply routes from Xingyang, the Han army was running short of supplies.  Liu Bang negotiated for an armistice with Xiang Yu and agreed to cede the lands east of Xingyang to Western Chu.  Xiang Yu wanted to accept Liu Bang's offer, but Fan Zeng advised him to reject it and use the opportunity to destroy Liu Bang.  Xiang Yu changed his mind, pressed the attack on Xingyang and besieged Liu Bang's forces inside the city. Liu Bang heeded Chen Ping's suggestion to bribe Xiang Yu's men with 40,000 catties of gold for them to spread rumours that Fan Zeng had the intention of betraying Xiang Yu. Xiang Yu fell for the ruse and dismissed Fan Zeng.

Later that year, while Xiang Yu was away suppressing the rebellion in the Qi kingdom, Li Yiji advised Liu Bang to use the opportunity to attack Western Chu. Han forces conquered Chenggao and defeated the Chu army led by Cao Jiu near the Si River.  Liu Bang's forces advanced further until they reached Guangwu (廣武). Chu forces led by Zhongli Mo were trapped by the Han army at the east of Xingyang.  Following Han Xin's victory in the Battle of Wei River, the Chu army's morale fell and it ran short of supplies months later.  Xiang Yu had no choice but to request to make peace with Liu Bang and released Liu's family members, who were held hostage by him. Chu and Han agreed to a ceasefire at the Treaty of Hong Canal (鴻溝和約), which divided China into east and west under their respective domains.

Battle of Gaixia

In 203 BC, while Xiang Yu was retreating eastward, Liu Bang, acting on the advice of Zhang Liang and Chen Ping, renounced the Treaty of Hong Canal and ordered an attack on Western Chu.  He also requested assistance from Han Xin and Peng Yue to attack Xiang Yu simultaneously from three directions.  However, Han Xin and Peng Yue did not mobilise their troops and Liu Bang was defeated by Xiang Yu at Guling (固陵; south of present-day Taikang County, Zhoukou, Henan), and was forced to retreat and reinforce his defences. At the same time, he sent messengers to meet Han Xin and Peng Yue again, and promised to give them land and titles if they joined him in attacking Xiang Yu, and they finally agreed.

Three months later in 202 BC, Han forces led by Liu Bang, Han Xin and Peng Yue attacked Western Chu from three directions.  The Chu army was running low on supplies and Xiang Yu was trapped in Gaixia. Han Xin ordered his troops to sing Chu folk songs to create a false impression that the Chu homeland had fallen to Han forces. The Chu army's morale plummeted and many soldiers deserted.  Xiang Yu attempted to break out of the siege, and after fighting out of repeated traps was left with only 28 men when he reached the northern bank of the Wu River (near present-day He County, Chaohu City, Anhui). He made a last stand and managed to slay several hundred Han soldiers before eventually committing suicide.

Establishment of the Han dynasty

In 202 BCE, Liu Bang was enthroned as the emperor with support from his subjects even though he expressed reluctance to take the throne. He named his dynasty "Han", and was historically known as "Emperor Gaozu" (or "Emperor Gao"). He established the capital in Luoyang (later moved to Chang'an) and instated his official spouse Lü Zhi as the empress and their son Liu Ying as the crown prince.

The following year, Emperor Gaozu wanted to reward his subjects who had contributed to the founding of the Han Empire, but the process dragged on for a year because they could not agree on the distribution of the rewards. The emperor thought that Xiao He's contributions were the greatest, so he awarded Xiao the title "Marquis of Zan" and gave him the largest amount of food stores. Some of the others expressed objections because they thought that Xiao was not directly involved in battle so his contributions should not be considered the greatest. Emperor Gaozu replied that Xiao He should receive the highest credit because he planned their overall strategy in the war against Xiang Yu. He named Cao Shen as the person who made the greatest contributions in battle and rewarded him and the others accordingly.

Reign

Reducing taxes and corvée
Emperor Gaozu disbanded his armies and allowed the soldiers to return home. He gave an order stating that the people who remained in Guanzhong were exempted from taxes and corvée for 12 years while those who returned to their respective native territories were exempted for six years and that the central government would provide for them for a year. He also granted freedom to those who had sold themselves into slavery to avoid hunger during the wars. In 195 BC, the emperor issued two decrees: the first officialised the lowering of taxes and corvée; the second set the amount of tribute to be paid by the vassal kings to the imperial court in the 10th month of every year. The land tax on agricultural production was reduced to a rate of 1/15 of crop yield. He also privatised the coinage.

Emphasis on Confucianism
In his early days, Emperor Gaozu disliked reading and scorned Confucianism. After becoming the emperor, he still held the same attitudes towards Confucianism as he did before until he encountered the scholar Lu Jia (or Lu Gu). Lu Gu wrote a 12-volume book, Xinyu, which espoused the benefits of governing by moral virtue as opposed to using harsh and punitive laws (as it was under the Qin dynasty). Lu Gu read each volume to the emperor after he finished writing it. The emperor was deeply impressed. Under Emperor Gaozu's reign, Confucianism flourished and gradually replaced Legalism (of Qin times) as the state ideology. Confucian scholars, including Lu Gu, were recruited to serve in the government. The emperor also reformed the legal system by relaxing some laws inherited from the Qin regime and reducing the severity of certain penalties. In January to February 195 BC, after suppressing a rebellion by Ying Bu, he passed by Shandong, the birthplace of Confucius, and personally prepared for a ceremony to pay respect to the philosopher.

Dispute over the succession
In his later years, Emperor Gaozu favoured Concubine Qi and neglected Empress Lü Zhi. He thought that Liu Ying, his heir apparent (born to the empress), was too weak to be a ruler. Thus, he had the intention of replacing Liu Ying with another son, Liu Ruyi, who was born to Concubine Qi. Lü Zhi became worried, so she asked Zhang Liang to help her son maintain his position. Zhang Liang recommended four reclusive wise men, the Four Whiteheads of Mount Shang, to help Liu Ying.

In 195 BC as Emperor Gaozu's health started to worsen, he desired even more to replace Liu Ying with Liu Ruyi as the crown prince. Zhang Liang tried to dissuade him but was ignored, so he retired on the excuse that he was ill. Shusun Tong (the crown prince's tutor) and Zhou Chang also strongly objected to the emperor's decision to replace Liu Ying with Liu Ruyi. Zhou Chang said, "I am not good in arguing, but I know this is not right. If Your Majesty deposes the Crown Prince, I won't follow your orders any more." Zhou Chang was outspoken and had a stutter, which to some made his speech very amusing. The emperor laughed. After that, the Four Whiteheads of Mount Shang (also known as the Four Haos of Mount Shang) showed up in the court. Emperor Gaozu was surprised to see them because they had previously declined to join the civil service when he invited them. The four men promised to help Liu Ying in the future if he were to remain as the crown prince. The emperor was pleased to see that Liu Ying had their support so he dismissed the idea of changing his heir apparent.

Military campaigns

After establishing the Han dynasty, Emperor Gaozu appointed princes and vassal kings to help him govern the Han Empire and gave each of them a piece of land. There were seven vassal kings who were not related to the imperial clan: Zang Tu, the King of Yan; Hán Xin, the King of Hán; Han Xin, the King of Chu; Peng Yue, the King of Liang; Ying Bu, the King of Huainan; Zhang Er, the King of Zhao; Wu Rui, the King of Changsha. However, later, the emperor became worried that the vassal kings might rebel against him because they, after all, had no blood relations with him. Han Xin and Peng Yue were (falsely) accused of treason, arrested and executed along with their families. Ying Bu and Zang Tu rebelled against him but were defeated and killed. Only Wu Rui and Zhang Er were left.

The Xiongnu in the north had been a threat since the Qin dynasty. Qin Shi Huang had sent the general Meng Tian to oversee the defences on the Qin Empire's northern border and the construction of the Great Wall to repel the invaders. Meng Tian achieved success in deterring the Xiongnu from advancing beyond the border. However, after the Qin dynasty collapsed, the Xiongnu seized the opportunity to move south and raid the border again. In 201 BCE, Hán Xin (King of Hán) defected to the Xiongnu leader, Modu. In the following year, Emperor Gaozu led an army to attack the Xiongnu but was besieged and trapped by the enemy at the Battle of Baideng. Acting on Chen Ping's advice, he bribed Modu's wife with gifts and got her to ask her husband to withdraw his forces. Modu did so. After returning to the capital, Emperor Gaozu, acting on advice from Liu (Lou) Jing, initiated the policy of heqin, which involved sending noble ladies to marry the Xiongnu leaders and paying annual tribute to the Xiongnu in exchange for peace between the Han Empire and the Xiongnu.

Ji Ru 
Gaozu is also recorded as having a pillow companion by the name of Ji Ru, who was said to have more access to the emperor than his own ministers. The founding emperor's example of elevating a male lover to the top of the administration would be followed by nine further rulers of the Han Dynasty.

Death

Emperor Gaozu was wounded by a stray arrow during the campaign against Ying Bu. He became seriously ill and remained in his inner chambers for a long period of time and ordered his guards to deny entry to everyone who tried to visit him. After several days, Fan Kuai barged into the chambers to see the emperor and the other subjects followed behind him. They saw Emperor Gaozu lying on his bed and attended to by a eunuch. Fan Kuai said, "How glorious it was when Your Majesty first led us to conquer the empire and how weary we are now. Your subjects are worried when they learn that Your Majesty is ill, but Your Majesty refuses to see us and prefers the company of a eunuch instead. Has Your Majesty forgotten the incident about Zhao Gao?" The emperor laughed and got out of bed to meet his subjects.

Emperor Gaozu's health deteriorated later so Empress Lü Zhi hired a famous physician to heal him. When Emperor Gaozu enquired about his condition, the physician told him that his illness could be cured, but the emperor was displeased and he scolded the physician, "Isn't it Heaven's will that I managed to conquer this empire in simple clothing and with nothing but a sword? My life is determined by Heaven. It is useless even if Bian Que is here!" He refused to continue with the treatment and sent the physician away. Before his death, he said that Cao Shen could succeed Xiao He as the chancellor after Xiao died, and that Wang Ling could succeed Cao Shen. He also said that Wang Ling might be too young to perform his duties so Chen Ping could assist Wang, but Chen was also qualified to assume the responsibilities of a chancellor all by himself. He also named Zhou Bo as a possible candidate for the role of Grand Commandant. He died in Changle Palace, Chang'an, on 1 June 195 BCE and was succeeded by Liu Ying, who became historically known as Emperor Hui.

Song of the Great Wind 
The Song of the Great Wind is a song composed by Liu Bang in 195 BC when he visited his hometown in Pei County after suppressing Ying Bu's rebellion. He prepared a banquet and invited all his old friends and townsfolk to join him. After some drinks, Liu Bang played the guqin and sang the Song of the Great Wind.

Family
Consorts and Issue:
 Empress Gao, of the Lü clan (241–180 BC), personal name Zhi
 Princess Yuan of Lu (d. 187 BC), first daughter
 Married Zhang Ao, Marquis Xuanping (d. 182 BC), and had issue (one daughter, Empress Xiaohui)
 Liu Ying, Emperor Xiaohui (210–188 BC), second son
 Empress Gao, of the Bo clan (d. 155 BC)
 Liu Heng, Emperor Xiaowen (203–157 BC), fourth son
 Furen, of the Cao clan, Liu Bang's first mistress 
 Liu Fei, King Daohui of Qi (221–189 BC), first son
 Furen of the Qi clan (224–194 BC), personal name Yi
 Liu Ruyi, King Yin of Zhao (208–194 BC), third son
 Meiren, of the Shi clan (美人 石氏)
 Lady, of the Zhao clan (d. 198 BC), personal name Zi'er (子兒)
 Liu Chang, King Li of Huainan (199–174 BC), seventh son
 Unknown
 Liu Hui, King Gong of Zhao (d. 181 BC), fifth son
 Liu You, King You of Zhao (d. 181 BC), sixth son
 Liu Jian, King Ling of Yan (d. 181 BC), eighth son

Ancestry

Modern references
Liu Bang is one of the 32 historical figures who appear as special characters in the video game Romance of the Three Kingdoms XI by Koei. His life story has also been dramatized in numerous TV series and films (see Chu–Han Contention).

See also

 Chu-Han contention
 Family tree of the Han Dynasty
 Lü Clan Disturbance

References

Citations

General references 
 Ban Gu et al. Book of Han, Volume 1.
 Needham, Joseph (1986). Science and Civilization in China: Volume 4, Part 2. Taipei: Caves Books, Ltd.
 Sima Qian. Records of the Grand Historian, Volume 8.

External links 
 
 

 
Emperor Gaozu of Han
Emperor Gaozu of Han
2nd-century BC Chinese monarchs
Emperor Gaozu of Han
Emperor Gaozu of Han
3rd-century BC Chinese monarchs
Ancient LGBT people
Emperor Gaozu of Han
Emperor Gaozu of Han
Emperor Gaozu of Han
Emperor Gaozu of Han
Emperor Gaozu of Han
Western Han dynasty emperors